The Eastern Australian sawshark, Pristiophorus peroniensis, is a sawshark of the family Pristiophoridae, found off southeastern mainland Australia at depths of between 100 and 630 m.  Its length is up to 1.36 m.

Prior to its description in 2008, this species was known as Pristiophorus sp. A.  This species is now considered to be a relative of Pristiophorus cirratus

References

 Compagno, Dando, & Fowler, Sharks of the World, Princeton University Press, New Jersey 2005 
 Heupel, M.R. 2003.  Pristiophorus peroniensis.   2006 IUCN Red List of Threatened Species.   Downloaded on 3 August 2007.

Pristiophorus
Ovoviviparous fish
Fish described in 2008